Wellingsson de Souza (born 7 September 1989) known as Wellingsson or Souza, is a Brazilian-born Hong Kong professional footballer who is currently a free agent.

Club career

Early career
Wellingsson played for some Campeonato Brasileiro Série A football team youth squads before, such as Associação Atlética Ponte Preta, Sport Club Corinthians Paulista and Associação Desportiva São Caetano.

South China
When Wellingsson was 20 years old, Hong Kong League champions South China signed him as a youth squad player, with the hope that he would be able to represent Hong Kong after residing in the country for 7 years.

Wellingsson played in South China's reserve team at the beginning. His debut match for the first team was against Sun Hei on 2 February 2010 when he substituted Kwok Kin Pong at the 86th minute.

On 7 March 2010 in the match against Rangers, Wellingsson substituted Hinson Leung at the 69th minute and scored at the 88th minute. This was Wellingsson's first goal in the Hong Kong First Division League, helping his club to win the match 5–2.

During the summer of 2011, he joined Partizan for a try-out and played 4 friendly games with the first team, but he returned to South China's training camp in South Korea.

On 10 April 2012, South China terminated their contract with Wellingsson after the player left Hong Kong without notifying the club in advance.

Yuen Long
On 17 June 2013, Wellingsson returned to Hong Kong and joined newly promoted Hong Kong First Division club Yuen Long for free after being unattached for a year. On 31 August 2013, he netted a brace on his debut for Yuen Long while the match ended 2–2.

Southern
Wellingsson signed with Southern in the summer of 2015 and went on to score 25 goals in 69 league appearances with the club in 4 years. 

On 31 May 2019, Southern announced that Wellingsson would leave the club.

Kitchee
On 3 July 2019, Kitchee announced the signing of Wellingsson. 

On 2 January 2022, Wellingsson extended his contract with Kitchee until the end of the 2021–22 season.

On 31 May 2022, Wellingsson left the club after finishing his contract.

International career
On 19 October 2021, Wellingsson officially announced that he had received a Hong Kong passport, making him eligible to represent Hong Kong internationally.

Honours
South China
 Hong Kong First Division: 2009–10
 Hong Kong Senior Shield: 2009–10

Kitchee
 Hong Kong Premier League: 2019–20
 Hong Kong Sapling Cup: 2019–20

References

External sources
 
 Wellingsson de Souza at HKFA
 
 

1989 births
Living people
Brazilian footballers
Hong Kong footballers
Brazilian emigrants to Hong Kong
Naturalized footballers of Hong Kong
South China AA players
Yuen Long FC players
Southern District FC players
Kitchee SC players
Brazilian expatriate footballers
Expatriate footballers in Hong Kong
Brazilian expatriate sportspeople in Hong Kong
Hong Kong First Division League players
Hong Kong Premier League players
Association football wingers
Hong Kong League XI representative players